Sydney Burdekin (18 February 1839 – 17 December 1899) was an Australian politician.

He was born in Sydney to merchant Thomas Burdekin and Mary Ann Bossley. He was educated at Darlinghurst and graduated from the University of Sydney in 1859 with a Bachelor of Arts. He became a solicitor's clerk, but apparently did not become a solicitor, instead becoming a pastoralist in northern New South Wales and Queensland. On 24 January 1872 he married Catherine Byrne, with whom he had eight children.

He was elected to the New South Wales Legislative Assembly as the member for Tamworth at the 1880 election, but he was defeated at the 1882 election contesting South Sydney. Having moved to Sydney, he was elected to Sydney City Council in 1883; he would serve on that council until 1898. In 1884 he was returned to the Assembly via the by-election for East Sydney. He was Mayor of Sydney from 1890 to 1891, when he retired from the Assembly; however, he won the 1892 by-election for Hawkesbury, but was defeated again in 1894. A Free Trader, he also served as director of Sydney Hospital from 1878 to 1899.

Burdekin died at Rooty Hill in 1899. His brother, Marshall Burdekin, was also a member of the Legislative Assembly.

References

 

1839 births
1899 deaths
Members of the New South Wales Legislative Assembly
Mayors and Lord Mayors of Sydney
Free Trade Party politicians
Politicians from Sydney
University of Sydney alumni
19th-century Australian politicians